The Central District of Ahar County is in East Azerbaijan province, Iran. At the 2006 census, its population was 125,253 in 29,323 households. The following census in 2011 counted 129,022 people in 34,244 households. At the latest census in 2016, the district had 133,829 inhabitants living in 40,048 households.

References 

Ahar County

Districts of East Azerbaijan Province

Populated places in East Azerbaijan Province

Populated places in Ahar County